Armand Liorat was the pen name of Georges Degas (10 January 1837 – 8 August 1898), a French playwright and librettist.

Life and career
Liorat was born in Sceaux, Hauts-de-Seine, the son of Pierre André Constant Degas, a lawyer, and his wife Rose Elisabeth Hermance, née Berthault. He entered the civil service in the office of the préfecture of the Seine, and rose to be chief inspector of administrative finance. Away from his official duties he wrote song-lyrics, and sketches for cafés-concerts. For the spoken drama and the opera he adopted the pen name Amand Liorat and, either alone or in collaboration with writers such as William Busnach, Clairville, Paul Bocage, Prével, Ferrier, wrote a large number of operetta librettos.

As well as librettos for the lyric stage, Liorat wrote some serious drama, including La belle aux cheveux d'or (1882) in collaboration with Arthur Arnould.

Liorat died suddenly, shortly before his last work, Les quatre filles Aymon was put into production at the Théâtre des Folies-Dramatiques.

Librettos

Source: Encyclopédie de l'art lyrique français.

Notes

1837 births
1898 deaths
19th-century French dramatists and playwrights
French opera librettists